Ernest Kabushemeye (died March 11, 1995) was a Burundian politician and the Minister for  Mines and Energy department. He led the Rally for the People of Burundi (RPB), legalized as a political party in 1992, and held several government positions before being assassinated on 11 March 1995.

His moto was "Nturenganywe" meaning "don't get your rights stomped on". He was a fighter of democracy.

References

Assassinated Burundian politicians
1995 deaths
Year of birth missing
People murdered in Burundi
Rally for the People of Burundi politicians
Hutu people